The 2018 Internazionali di Tennis Città dell'Aquila was a professional tennis tournament played on clay courts. It was the 12th edition of the men's tournament which was part of the 2018 ATP Challenger Tour. The event took place in L'Aquila, Italy between 18 – 24 June 2018.

Singles main draw entrants

Seeds 

 1 Rankings as of 11 June 2018.

Other entrants 
The following players received wildcards into the singles main draw:
  Riccardo Balzerani
  Giovanni Fonio
  Julian Ocleppo
  Andrea Pellegrino

The following players received entry into the singles main draw as alternates:
  Facundo Bagnis
  Filippo Baldi

The following players received entry from the qualifying draw:
  Riccardo Bonadio
  Johannes Härteis
  Benjamin Hassan
  Agustín Velotti

The following player received entry as a lucky loser:
  Gianluca Mager

Champions

Singles 

  Facundo Bagnis def.  Paolo Lorenzi 2–6, 6–3, 6–4.

Doubles 

  Filippo Baldi /  Andrea Pellegrino def.  Pedro Martínez /  Mark Vervoort 4–6, 6–3, [10–5].

References

Internazionali di Tennis Città dell'Aquila
2018
2018 in Italian tennis